Glitching is an activity in which a person finds and exploits flaws or glitches in video games to achieve something that was not intended by the game designers. Players who engage in this practice are known as glitchers. Some glitches can be easily achieved, while others are either very difficult or unperformable by humans and can only be achieved with tool-assisted input. Glitches can vary greatly in the level of game manipulation, from setting a flag to writing and executing custom code from within the game.

Glitches may be found by accident or actively searched for. They require testing and experimentation by the player to be repeatable with some level of success. They can be achieved in many different ways, most often through user input from a game controller, but can also be assisted through hardware manipulation. The mechanics of some glitches are well-understood, due to having access to the game's code or knowing the properties being manipulated, while others are performable but the mechanic to it is unknown. Some glitches are not consistently performable due to uncontrollable factors, usually broadly referred to as random number generation (frequently called RNG).

Glitching is used in speedrunning and competitive gaming, as well as a tool to gain insight on a game's underlying technical mechanics and code. In some contexts, it is considered a form of cheating, and competitions may disallow certain glitches to allow for a more fair or entertaining experience. Many speedrunning communities create separate categories of runs that either restrict or allow use of certain glitches, giving speedrunners the freedom to choose the category that suits their interests or goals.

Overview
One of the most common glitches in video games is clipping, which is used to pass though a wall or barrier to access certain areas that would be inaccessible in normal gameplay. These areas could be out of bounds, when the player-character is in a place never intended by the game developers, or it could be used as a form of sequence breaking, as a means of accessing a region that is locked, such as entering a locked room without a key. Glitches that go out of bounds are mostly performed by either moving through walls or corners or jumping to places in the map that do not have invisible walls. In these areas, many maps have hollow objects that the player can move through freely. These objects usually are in the distance and are for decoration, lacking any collision detection.

For example, in Tony Hawk's Underground 2, in the L.A. level there is a glitch that can allow players to leave the provided play area and pass through the background. The massively multiplayer online game Need for Speed: World also had a bug in the city Rockport, where the player can glitch into point Camden near the Bay Bridge. Clipping is exploited by speedrunners to engage in sequence breaking in games like Metroid Prime, which can cause them to behave abnormally especially if they have no code to address it. Players may fall into a bottomless pit by glitching through a wall if there is no ground collision. Such glitches can also allow players to go to areas that they are not supposed to go, such as entering beta areas in Grand Theft Auto IV by using a helicopter to clip through the ground and under the map.

Another common type of glitch is item manipulation, where a player can manipulate their inventory to get certain items. This can also be expanded to changing the player's health, magic power, inventory capacity, quest status, item durability, and so on. These manipulations are often not limited by the game's set boundaries, and allow the player to access glitched items. Players can obtain a very high amount of resources just by trying to acquire negative values for certain resource counters that are not coded to handle them. One example of this bug is in the PlayStation 3 and Xbox 360 versions of FIFA 11, in which the game does not check for negative values for the player's currency counter, meaning that if a player cancels a loan and there is not enough currency available in the transfer budget, the currency counter will roll over back to the highest number, granting the player a large amount of wealth. 

Glitches can also affect the physics of particular games, which can alter the state of gravity, movement speed, or even allow teleportation.  A famous physics bug is found in Grand Theft Auto IV, in which a particular swingset can violently catapult anyone and anything that touches its chains or approaches its top bar for a great distance, due to coding flaws concerning the physics of the swing chains. Grand Theft Auto III and Grand Theft Auto V also have a similar physics bug where approaching certain closed gates would cause the player character or vehicle to be launched into the sky for a great distance.  

There are also glitches that do not require any action on the part of the player, such as a glitch in NCAA Football 11 which will cause the football game to run longer than the time indicated on the clock and, most often, indefinitely.

Such glitches can hurt the competitive atmosphere of online multiplayer games. For example, there have been reports that the online multiplayer mode of Transformers: War for Cybertron suffered from hacking and glitches that allow players to manipulate classes and stats through methods not normally available to regular players.

Memory manipulation and arbitrary code execution 
An advanced form of glitching allows the player to access parts of the game's memory in order to change the state of gameplay. This can be done by executing movements and changing the positions of entities, sprites, or actors in a specific way that put particular memory addresses in an order that gives the player the ability to alter an aspect of the game, and can be expanded to giving the player the ability to execute custom code. This is possible in Super Mario World, where if the player causes entities such as Koopa shells, brick particles, and fireballs to despawn at certain coordinates, the memory will be read and executed as code. Another example of altering code is in The Legend of Zelda: Ocarina of Time, where if the player locks the states of certain actors in memory by unloading them in a certain order, Link can pick up an item and his angle of rotation will be linked to a different memory address, such as the value that determine which boots he is wearing. If this is done correctly, the player could obtain a glitched version of boots called "F boots" that have no gravity at all, allowing Link to fly as far as desired.

In some instances, glitches are physically impossible for a human as they require inputs with frame-perfect accuracy and precision, or they may be simply impossible on a physical controller. Glitches like these often require pressing several buttons at 60 frames per second, potentially in complex combinations, or pressing both left and right on a D-pad. This is solved by using tools that automatically sends inputs to the game, such as a macro on an emulator.

Hardware manipulation 
Some glitches can only occur by physically manipulating the hardware of the game system, such as ejecting a disc during gameplay or slightly tilting a cartridge out of position. A somewhat extreme example of hardware manipulation is, after noticing a certain glitch only seemed to work in the summer, Japanese speedrunner Hitshee discovered that heating his Famicom to a certain temperature caused a glitch in the save files for Dragon Quest III, and now keeps his console on a hot plate during speedruns.

See also
 Circuit bending
 Fuzzing
 Glitch

References

Digital electronics
Software bugs
Software anomalies
Computer errors
Video game culture
Video game glitches